Aleksandr Stanislavovich Kutyin (born 13 February 1986) is a Russian professional football player. He plays as a striker.

Club career
He made his Russian Premier League debut for FC Arsenal Tula on 10 August 2014 in a game against FC Lokomotiv Moscow, after helping Arsenal achieve two consecutive promotions with 16 and 19 goals seasons respectively.

Honours
 Russian National Football League top scorer: 2013–14.
 Russian Professional Football League Zone Center top scorer: 2012–13.

External links
 
 

1986 births
People from Yelets
Living people
Russian footballers
Association football forwards
FC Metallurg Lipetsk players
FC Tyumen players
FC Arsenal Tula players
Russian Premier League players
FC Tosno players
FC Yenisey Krasnoyarsk players
FC Luch Vladivostok players
Sportspeople from Lipetsk Oblast